Hanegraaff is a surname. Notable people with the surname include: 

 Hank Hanegraaff (born 1950), American Christian author and radio talk-show host 
 Wouter Hanegraaff (born 1961), Dutch academic, expert on Western esotericism

See also
 Hanegraaf

Dutch-language surnames